ATCOM may refer to:

 The United States Army Aviation and Missile Command (ATCOM)
 Atcom S.A., an Athens based, software company